Salbia haemorrhoidalis, the lantana leaftier, is a moth of the family Crambidae. It is native to South America, Central America, the Antilles and the southern United States, but has been introduced in Hawaii in 1956, Queensland in 1958 and Réunion, Mauritius to control Lantana. The species was first described by Achille Guenée in 1854.

The larvae feed on the leaves of Lantana species.

References

External links

Moths of Jamaica

Spilomelinae
Moths of Mauritius
Moths of Réunion
Moths described in 1854
Moths of Central America
Moths of South America